Augusto Vargas Alzamora S.J. (9 November 1922 – 4 September 2000) was a Cardinal Priest and Archbishop of Lima in the Roman Catholic Church.

He joined the Society of Jesus in 1940. He studied at the Jesuit Philosophical Faculty in San Miguel, Argentina and Madrid. He continued his studies in Granada, Spain and the University of San Marcos, Lima, where he received his doctorate in education. Pope Paul VI appointed him titular bishop of Cissi and apostolic vicar of Jaén, Peru on 8 June 1978. In 1982 he was elected secretary general of the Episcopal conference of Peru, and was reelected twice more. He was to become its president from 1993 to 1999. He resigned the pastoral government of the vicariate in 1985. In 1989 Pope John Paul II appointed him Archbishop of Lima, where he stayed until he retired in 1999. Pope John Paul elevated him to the cardinalate in the consistory of 26 November 1994, making him Cardinal Priest of S. Roberto Bellarmino. After he retired as Archbishop he continued until his death ministering at a homeless shelter he founded in Lima.

As Archbishop of Lima, he frequently clashed with Peruvian President Alberto Fujimori, demanding that the president observe human rights and democratic forms, and, at a later stage, over the president's pushing of family planning programmes. He campaigned openly against Fujimori's election.

References

External links
 

1922 births
2000 deaths
20th-century Roman Catholic archbishops in Peru
Roman Catholic archbishops of Lima
20th-century Peruvian Jesuits
Burials at the Cathedral of Lima
Cardinals created by Pope John Paul II
Jesuit cardinals
Jesuit archbishops
Roman Catholic bishops of Jaén in Peru